Vasilis Michaelides (before 1853–18 December 1917) is considered by many and often referred to as the national poet of Cyprus.

Michaelides was born in Lefkoniko, a village in the Famagusta District of Cyprus, between 1849 and 1853. In 1862 he moved to Nicosia to attend Secondary School. His first contact with the arts came in the form of religious icons in the archbishopric in Nicosia, where he trained as an artist. He subsequently moved to the Diocese of Larnaca where concentrated on painting in the care of his uncle. In 1873 he published his first poems "Usury" and "Nightingales and Owls" and in 1875 he moved to Naples, Italy for further studies in painting. Michaelides left Italy in 1877 and went to Greece where he enlisted as a volunteer in the Greek army and fought for the liberation of Thessaly. With the end of Ottoman rule of Cyprus in 1878, he returned to Limassol, Cyprus, staying at the local premises of the Diocese of Larnaca. There he began to write for the local newspaper "Alithia" ( "Truth").

Michaelides wrote several poems in Katharevousa, Dhimotiki and the Cypriot Dialect. His first poetry collection, "The Weak Lyre", was published in 1882. In 1884 he was appointed to work as a nurse thereby securing an income, room and board. He then began to write for the newspaper "Salpinga"( "Clarion"). In 1888 he began the publication of the satirical magazine "Diavolos" ( "Devil").

In 1883 he wrote "The Fairy", followed by his most famous work "The 9th of July 1821", a poem written in the Cypriot dialect detailing the events leading to the execution of the Greek Cypriot leadership, including  Archbishop Kyprianos, by the Ottoman rulers of the time.

—from Ἑννάτη Ἰουλίου, Βασίλης Μιχαηλίδης

The "9th of July" was followed by "The Woman From Chios".

The latter part of his life was plagued by alcoholism. In 1910 he lost his job as a nurse, but the Limassol Municipality gave him a new job as a Health Inspector as well as a room to stay at the town hall.  In 1911 he published "Poems". In 1915 he ended up at the Limassol poorhouse where he wrote "The Dream of the Greek".

He died penniless and an alcoholic on 18 December 1917.

In 1978, his portrait was depicted on one of a series of stamps themed on Cypriot poets.

External links

 Full text of "The 9th of July 1821" in Cypriot dialect and English translation
 Cyprus Stamp Issue: Cypriot Poets: Demetrios Lipertis and Vasilis Michaelides

Year of birth unknown
1917 deaths
Greek Cypriot poets
1849 births